Russian Journal of Physical Chemistry B (Russian: Khimicheskaya Fizika) is an English-language translation of the Russian-language peer-reviewed scientific journal published by MAIK Nauka/Interperiodica and Springer Science+Business Media. The journal covers all aspects of chemical physics and combustion. The editor-in-chief is Anatoly L. Buchachenko (Russian Academy of Sciences).

Abstracting and indexing
 Current Contents/Physical, Chemical and Earth Sciences
 Reaction Citation Index
 Science Citation Index Expanded 
 Journal Citation Reports/Science Edition
 Chemical Abstracts Service
 Scopus 
 Inspec

See also
 Russian Journal of Physical Chemistry A
 Annual Review of Physical Chemistry
 Journal of Chemical Physics
 Journal of Physical Chemistry B
 Chemical physics

References

External links 
 

Nauka academic journals
Springer Science+Business Media academic journals
English-language journals
Russian-language journals
Physical chemistry journals
Publications established in 1982
Bimonthly journals
Russian Academy of Sciences academic journals